GOR Sahabat is a multifunctional sports arena in Semarang, Indonesia. The arena is home to the Sahabat Semarang basketball team from WIBL. It can also accommodate basketball, karate, taekwondo and other events. GOR Sahabat usually becomes one of the match venues for IBL and WIBL.

References

Indoor arenas in Indonesia
Basketball venues in Indonesia
Sports venues in Semarang
Buildings and structures in Semarang